Misael Vilugrón (11 February 1938 – 4 June 2011) was a Chilean boxer. He competed at the 1964 Summer Olympics and the 1968 Summer Olympics. At the 1968 Summer Olympics, he lost to Jan van Ispelen of the Netherlands.

References

1938 births
2011 deaths
Welterweight boxers
Chilean male boxers
Olympic boxers of Chile
Boxers at the 1964 Summer Olympics
Boxers at the 1968 Summer Olympics
Pan American Games gold medalists for Chile
Pan American Games medalists in boxing
Boxers at the 1963 Pan American Games
Place of birth missing
Medalists at the 1963 Pan American Games
20th-century Chilean people